Dr. Walter F. Huebner (born February 22, 1928 in New York City; died June 1, 2021 in Norman, Oklahoma) was an astrophysicist who wrote several books on comets including close-orbit and asteroids that may collide with the Earth, and how to prevent catastrophic collisions.

He received his Ph.D. from Yale in 1959. He worked as a leading scientist at Los Alamos National Laboratory from 1957 to 1987, and was associated with Southwest Research Institute in San Antonio,  Texas, from 1987 to 2018.

He was affiliated with the IAU, Division XII, Commission 14 Atomic & Molecular Data, Division III WG Near Earth Objects, and Division XII Union-Wide Activities. He was the  President of Division III, Commission 15 Physical Study of Comets & Minor Planets (2006–2009), Vice-President of Division III, Commission 15 Physical Study of Comets & Minor Planets (2003–2006), and an Organizing Committee Member of Division III Planetary Systems Sciences (2006–2009).

Asteroid (7921) Huebner has been named in his honor.

Bibliography 
G. H. F. Diercksen, W. F. Huebner, and P. W. Langhoff.,eds. Molecular Astrophysics: State of the Art and Future Directions. Dordrecht: D. Reidel Pub. Co., 1985. 
 Walter F. Huebner, ed.  Physics and Chemistry of Comets.  Berlin: Springer-Verlag, 1990. 
 Walter F. Huebner. Heat and gas diffusion in comet nuclei. Bern : ISSI, International Space Science Institute ; Noordwijk : ESA Publications Division,  2006. OCLC 428187061
 Huebner, W. F., and W. David Barfield. Opacity. 2014. New York : Springer, 2014. .

References

External references 

 "IAU Walter F. Huebner"
 "Walter F. Huebner"

1928 births
2021 deaths
American astrophysicists
Yale University alumni
Los Alamos National Laboratory personnel
People from New York City